Ahir or Aheer are a community of traditionally non-elite pastoralists in India, most members of which identify as being of the Indian Yadav community because they consider the two terms to be synonymous. The Ahirs are variously described as a caste, a clan, a community, a race and a tribe.

The traditional occupations of Ahirs are cattle-herding and agriculture. Since late 19th century to early 20th century, Ahirs have adopted Yadav word for their community and have claimed descent from the mythological king Yadu as a part of a movement of social and political resurgence through Sanskritisation process under the influence of Arya Samaj. They  are found throughout India but are particularly concentrated in the northern area. Apart from India, Ahirs have significant population in Nepal, Mauritius, Fiji, South Africa and the Caribbean especially Guyana, Trinidad and Tobago, and Suriname. In Mauritius and Caribbean they are mostly the descendants of settlers who arrived between the 19th and 20th centuries from the former pre-partitioned sub-continent of India during the time of the British Raj. Ahirs in India are known by numerous other names, including Gauli and Ghosi or Gop in North India. In Gujarat and South India as Ayar, Golla and Konar. Some in the Bundelkhand region of Uttar Pradesh are known as Dauwa. The Ahirs have more than 20 sub-castes.

Etymology 
Gaṅga Ram Garg considers the Ahir to be a tribe descended from the ancient Abhira community, whose precise location in India is the subject of various theories based mostly on interpretations of old texts such as the Mahabharata and the writings of Ptolemy. He believes the word Ahir to be the Prakrit form of a Sanskrit word, Abhira, and he notes that the present term in the Bengali and Marathi languages is Abhir.

Garg distinguishes a Brahmin community who use the Abhira name and are found in the present-day states of Maharashtra and Gujarat. That usage, he says, is because that division of Brahmins were priests to the ancient Abhira tribe.

History

Early history 
Theories regarding the origins of the ancient Abhira – the putative ancestors of the Ahirs – are varied for the same reasons as are the theories regarding their location; that is, there is a reliance on interpretation of linguistic and factual analysis of old texts that are known to be unreliable and ambiguous.

Some, such as A. P. Karmakar, consider the Abhira to be a Proto-Dravidian tribe who migrated to India and point to the Puranas as evidence. Others, such as Sunil Kumar Bhattacharya, say that the Abhira are recorded as being in India in the 1st-century CE work, the Periplus of the Erythraean Sea. Bhattacharya considers the Abhira of old to be a race rather than a tribe. The sociologist M. S. A. Rao and historians such as P. M. Chandorkar and T. Padmaja say that epigraphical and historical evidence exists for equating the Ahirs with the ancient Yadava tribe.

Whether they were a race or a tribe, nomadic in tendency or displaced or part of a conquering wave, with origins in Indo-Scythia or Central Asia, Aryan or Dravidian – there is no academic consensus, and much in the differences of opinion relate to fundamental aspects of historiography, such as controversies regarding dating the writing of the Mahabharata and acceptance or otherwise of the Indo-Aryan migration (which is universally accepted in mainstream scholarship). Similarly, there is no certainty regarding the occupational status of the Abhira, with ancient texts sometimes referring to them as pastoral and cowherders but at other times as robber tribes.

Kingdoms 

Asirgarh fort of Asa Ahir
 13th or 14th century A.D. Bijagarh Fort of Bija, a Gauli Raja
 Thakur Laxman Singh, an Ahir ruler of Naigaon Ribai, Bundelkhand
 Rao Tula Ram, king of Rewari
 Veersen of Nasik
 Ahir dynasty in pre-12th century areas in present-day Nepal
Ahir-Rajas of Sagar
Bhandaria, Bodanones and Morchopna were some of the few villages ruled by Kamaliya clan of Ahirs.

Military involvements 
The British rulers of India classified the Ahirs of Punjab as an "agricultural tribe" in the 1920s, which was at that time synonymous with being a "martial race". This was a designation created by administrators that classified each ethnic group as either "martial" or "non-martial": a "martial race" was typically considered brave and well built for fighting, whilst the remainder were those whom the British believed to be unfit for battle because of their sedentary lifestyles. However, the martial races were also considered politically subservient, intellectually inferior, lacking the initiative or leadership qualities to command large military formations. The British had a policy of recruiting the martial Indians from those who has less access to education as they were easier to control. According to modern historian Jeffrey Greenhunt on military history, "The Martial Race theory had an elegant symmetry. Indians who were intelligent and educated were defined as cowards, while those defined as brave were uneducated and backward". According to Amiya Samanta, the marital race was chosen from people of mercenary spirit (a soldier who fights for any group or country that will pay him/her), as these groups lacked nationalism as a trait. Ahirs had been recruited into the army from 1898. In that year, the British raised four Ahir companies, two of which were in the 95th Russell's Infantry. In post-independence India, some Ahir units have been involved in celebrated military actions, such as at Rezang La in the 1962 Sino-Indian War that saw the last stand of Charlie company, consisting of 114 Ahirs of 13 Kumaon, and in the 1965 India-Pakistan War.

Sanskritisation

Recreating the past for new identity
It was from the 1920s that some Ahirs began to adopt the name of Yadav and created the Yadav Mahasabha, founded by ideologues such as Rajit Singh. Several caste histories and periodicals to trace a Kshatriya origin were written at the time, notably by Mannanlal Abhimanyu. These were part of the jostling among various castes for socio-economic status and ritual under the Raj and they invoked support for a zealous, martial Hindu ethos. Arya Samaj, a Hindu reformist organization also played an important role in ritual purification of Ahir/Yadavs and many low castes in order to incorporate them into Vedic Hinduism. In U.P, it was through shastrarth debates and with the help of reform movements like Arya Samaj and Vaishnava Ramanandi order in public debates that the Ahirs defended their claims to a higher social status. At the same time Ahir/Yadav intelligentsia also emphasized the socio-economic backwardness faced by their community and in 1927, a petition was sent to the Simon Commission describing how the Ahirs suffers from the same social disabilities and discrimination as the Chamars. Despite explicitly expressing their commitment against untouchability, it has been observed that these movements by Yadav caste associations have not been egalitarian enough to include communities who are under Scheduled Castes and have claimed connection with Krishna.

Participation in reactionary communal conflicts 
The Ahirs in certain region of UP had been one of the more militant Hindu groups during pre-independent India. In one of the instances before independence, Hindu shudra caste groups such as the Ahirs actively participated in a counter-reactionary communal conflict orchestrated by Arya Samaj. Some writers are also of the opinion that many low-castes (including Ahirs) took to cow protection for asserting higher status since cow already had symbolic importance in Hinduism. This view of cow protection was different from the UP's urban elites.

Distribution

North India 
They  have a significant population in the region around Behror, Alwar, Rewari, Narnaul, Mahendragarh, Gurgaon and Jhajjar – the region is therefore known as Ahirwal or the abode of Ahirs.

Maharashtra 
Ahirs live in the Khandesh region of Maharashtra. The community has been influential in the history of the region. Inscriptions indicate that ancient Abhiras ruled this region and Abhira kings have made a significant contribution to the making of the region. Ahir ethnicity is visible among various castes in Khandesh, including Maratha and Brahmins. Ahirani dialect continues to be spoken today in the region and is widespread across Jalgaon, Dhule and Nashik. It is an admixture of Marathi, Gujarati, Hindi, ancient Magadhi, Saurashtri, Sauraseni, Lati, Maharashtri, Prakrit and Paishachi.

Culture

Diet 
In 1901, Bhimbhai Kirparam noted that Ahirs in Gujarat ate meat (not including beef) and moderately drank liquor when able to purchase it.

In 1992, Noor Mohammad noted that most Ahirs in Uttar Pradesh were vegetarian, with some exceptions who were engaged in fishing and raising poultry.

Language and tradition 
According to Alain Daniélou the Ahirs belong to the same culture as the dark skinned prominent figures of the Ramayana and Mahabharata, Rama and Krishna. Ahirs of Benares speak a Hindi dialect which is different from one used normally. Ahirs usually speak language of the region in which they live. Some languages/dialects named after Ahirs are Ahirani, also known as Khandeshi, spoken in Khandesh region of Maharashtra, Ahirwati spoken in Ahirwal region of Haryana and Rajasthan. The Malwi spoken is Malwa region of Rajasthan and Madhya Pradesh is also known as Ahiri. These dialects are named after Ahirs but not necessarily only spoken by Ahirs living in those areas or all Ahirs in those regions speak these dialects.
 
The Ahirs have three major classifications Yaduvanshi, Nandavanshi and Goallavanshi. Yaduvanshi claim descent from Yadu, Nandavansh claim descent from Nanda, the foster father of Krishna and Goallavanshi claim descent from gopi and gopas of Krishna's childhood.

Folklore 
The oral epic of Veer Lorik, a mythical Ahir hero, has been sung by folk singers in North India for generations. Mulla Daud, a Sufi Muslim, retold the romantic story in writing in the 14th century. Other Ahir folk traditions include those related to Kajri and Biraha.

See also 
 Ahir clans

References 

 
Social groups of Bihar
Social groups of Haryana